Zurcheria is a genus of dwarf ammonites from the Middle Jurassic included in the Hammatoceratidae and lacking a keel. The shell is evolute, inner whorls exposed; whorls compressed and slightly overlapping. Bears ribs, which are sinuous folds that project strongly onto the arched venter.

References 
Notes

Bibliography
 W.J. Arkell, et al., 1957. Mesozoic Ammonoidea, Treatise on Invertebrate Paleontology, Part L, Mollusca 4. Geological Society of America and University of Kansas Press.

Hammatoceratidae
Ammonitida genera
Middle Jurassic ammonites